Miroslav Pupák (born January 20, 1985) is a Slovak professional ice hockey forward for HK Nitra of the Tipos Extraliga.

Pupák has played the majority of his career with his hometown team HK Nitra, playing from 2003 to 2007 and from 2012 up to the present day. He is the team's all-time leader in games played with 659 games up to the end of the 2019–20 season.

Pupák also spent a season with MHk 32 Liptovský Mikuláš as well as a season with HSC Csíkszereda of the MOL Liga and the Romanian Hockey League.

References

External links
 

1985 births
Living people
HSC Csíkszereda players
HK Levice players
MHk 32 Liptovský Mikuláš players
HK Nitra players
HC Nové Zámky players
ŠHK 37 Piešťany players
Slovak ice hockey forwards
HK Spišská Nová Ves players
Sportspeople from Nitra
Slovak expatriate ice hockey people
Slovak expatriate sportspeople in Romania
Expatriate ice hockey players in Romania